Éric Messier (born October 29, 1973) is a Canadian former professional ice hockey defenceman who played eight seasons in the National Hockey League (NHL) for the Colorado Avalanche and Florida Panthers.

Playing career
As a youth, Messier played in the 1985 and 1986 Quebec International Pee-Wee Hockey Tournaments with a minor ice hockey team from Drummondville.

Messier played in the Quebec Major Junior Hockey League for the Trois-Rivières Draveurs and then the Sherbrooke Faucons after the Draveurs relocated to Sherbrooke. 

He signed with the Colorado Avalanche as a free agent in 1995 and was assigned to the American Hockey League's Cornwall Aces for one season before Messier and all Avalanche players assigned to the Aces were transferred to the Hershey Bears as the Aces folded. Messier won the Calder Cup in 1997 with the Bears.. 

Messier was called up to the main roster in that season for the first time and played 21 games. He went on to play seven seasons for the Avalanche, playing a total of 385 regular season games and 72 playoff games, ultimately winning the Stanley Cup with Colorado in 2001. In 2003, Messier was traded to the Florida Panthers with Vaclav Nedorost for Peter Worrell and Florida's 2nd round pick in the 2004 NHL Entry Draft. He suffered what proved to be a career-ending wrist injury on his first shift in a November 21, 2003 game.

Career statistics

Awards and honours

References

External links

1973 births
Living people
Canadian ice hockey defencemen
Colorado Avalanche players
Cornwall Aces players
Florida Panthers players
Hershey Bears players
Ice hockey people from Quebec
Montreal Roadrunners players
Sherbrooke Faucons players
Sportspeople from Drummondville
Stanley Cup champions
Trois-Rivières Draveurs players
Undrafted National Hockey League players